The 1925–26 season was Real Madrid Club de Fútbol's 24th season in existence. The club played some friendly matches. They also played in the Campeonato Regional Centro (Central Regional Championship) and the Copa del Rey.

Friendlies

Competitions

Overview

Campeonato Regional Centro

League table

Matches

Copa del Rey

Group stage

Quarterfinals

Notes

References

Real Madrid
Real Madrid CF seasons